John of Luxembourg (Jean de Luxembourg) ( – bef. 2 July 1397, Italy), was Lord of Beauvoir (or Beaurevoir) and Richebourg, and also (as John II) Count of Brienne and Conversano.

He was a member of the French branch of the House of Luxembourg, the son of Guy I of Luxembourg, Count of Ligny and Mahaut de Châtillon (1335–1378), Countess of Saint-Pol.

John married around 1387 with Margaret, Countess of Brienne, daughter of Louis of Enghien,  heiress of the counties of Brienne and of Conversano, and the Lordship of Enghien.

They had five children:
 Peter I of Luxembourg (1390 – 31 August 1433), Count of Saint-Pol and Count of Brienne
 John II of Luxembourg, Count of Ligny (1392 – 5 January 1441), inherited the title of Beauvoir from his father, and the title of Ligny from his aunt, Jeanne of Luxembourg. 
 Louis of Luxembourg (died 18 September 1443). He was a statesman and a high-ranking churchman. 
 Catherine of Luxembourg (born c. 1393)
 Jeanne of Luxembourg (died 1420), married firstly, on 8 September 1415, Louis, Seigneur de Ghistelles (killed at the Battle of Agincourt); she married secondly on 28 October 1419, Jean IV, Viscount of Melun, Constable of Flanders.

References

Sources

External links 
 GeneAll.net
 Genealogical database by Herbert Stoyan

1397 deaths
House of Luxembourg
Counts of Brienne
Counts of Conversano
Year of birth unknown